Grove School, or a name similar, may refer to one these schools:

U.S.
 Grove School (Connecticut)
 The Grove School in California
 Grove High School in Oklahoma
 Cary-Grove High School in Illinois
 Grove City High School in Ohio

U.K.
 Grove School, Market Drayton in Market Drayton, Shropshire, England
 Grove House School, a Quaker school in Tottenham
 Grove Park School, in north-east Wales
 Highbury Grove School, London

See also
 
 Grove High School (disambiguation)
 Groves High School (disambiguation)
 Grove Primary School (disambiguation)